The Parametric transformer (or paraformer) is a particular type of transformer. It transfers the power from primary to secondary windings not by mutual inductance coupling but by a variation of a parameter in its magnetic circuit.  First described by Wanlass, et al., 1968.

Assuming Faraday's law of induction,

 
it is possible to obtain a voltage at the secondary winding terminals also thanks to a variation of the inductance, so that

 
    
This can be accomplished by for example modulating the saturation of the core by means of an applied variable magnetic field. It works even if primary and secondary windings magnetic coupling is zero (when the fluxes are mutually orthogonal) (Burian 1972, p. 278).

Further reading
S. D. Wanlass, C. L. Wanlass, L. K. Wanlass, "The Paraformer; A new passive power conversion device", IEEE Wescon Tech. Papers, 1968.
Burian, Kurt, "Theory and analysis of a parametrically excited passive power converter", IEEE Transactions on Industry Applications, vol. IA-8, iss. 3, pp. 278–282, May 1972.
Power, Henry Al, "Analysis of a passive power converter as a nonlinear feedback system", IEEE Transactions on Industry Applications, vol. IA-11, iss. 5, pp. 556–559, September 1975.
Bessho, K.; Matsumura, F.;  Aoki, Y.;  Suzuki, M., "Theory and analysis of a new power converter with center-tap reactor circuit", IEEE Transactions on Magnetics, vol. 11, iss. 5, pp. 1558–1560, September 1975.
Tez, E. Salih; Smith, I. R., The Parametric transformer: a power conversion device demonstrating the principles of parametric excitation", IEEE Transactions on Education, vol. 27, iss. 2, pp. 56–57, May 1984 (includes history of the principle).
Newark Electronics, "Newark-Denver Electronic Supply Co., Wanlass Parax Voltage Regulators and Paraformer" Wanlass "Parax Voltage Regulators and Paraformer," Newark-Denver Electronic Supply Company 1970 catalog pg. 252. Archived at Pro Audio design Forum.

Electric transformers